Skørping is a railway town in Rebild Municipality in Region Nordjylland in the geographic region of the Jutland peninsula known as Himmerland in northern Denmark. The modern town has a population of 2,971 as of 1 January 2022;

Skørping was the municipal seat of 
the former Skørping Municipality (Danish, kommune), until 1 January 2007.

Skørping Municipality

The former Skørping municipality covered an area of 238 km², and had a total population of 9,835 in 2005.

On January 1, 2007, Skørping Municipality ceased to exist as a result of the 2007 Kommunalreformen ("Municipality Reform"). It was merged with Nørager and Støvring municipalities to form the new Rebild Municipality.  This created a municipality with an area of 628 km² and a total population of 28,457 (2005 figures).

Attractions
The town is in the middle of the Rold Forest (Rold Skov), Denmark's second largest forested area; Lake Madum and Large Oks Lake (Store Økssø) lie south of the town of Skørping.

Rebild Bakker ("Rebild Hills") is a national park consisting of heather-covered hills, located in the municipality near the village of Rebild.  The area was purchased in 1911 by a group of Americans of Danish descent. The effort was led by Max Henius, a Danish-American biochemist.  In 1912 the park was given to the Danish state as a present with three conditions:
 That the area should remain in a natural state;
 That it would be open to the public;
 That Danish-Americans could celebrate American holidays at the park.

The Rebild National Park Society Inc. is an American non-profit company, whose purpose is to arrange an annual Independence Day (4th of July) festival at the park.  The first Rebild Festival took place in 1912, when King Christian X spoke to a crowd of 10,000.  The day has been celebrated every year since then, with the exception of the periods during World War I and World War II. It is the largest Fourth of July celebration outside the United States, and features speeches by American and Danish politicians, as well as general entertainment.

The park is visited by 400,000 people each year, making it one of Denmark's major tourist attractions.  It has many hiking trails, and sheep wander loose in the hilly terrain.  There is also a full-size reproduction of Abraham Lincoln's log cabin and a totem pole in the park.

Notable people 

 Jørgen Friis (?? - died in 1616 in Skørping) a Danish lord and Governor-general of Norway
 Anders Bundgaard (1864 in Ersted near Skørping – 1937) a Danish sculptor
 Evald Thomsen (1913 in Siem near Skørping – 1993) a fiddler and collector and promoter of Danish traditional music
 Thyra Frank (born 1952 in Skørping) a Danish nurse and politician
 Jesper Møller (born 1963 in Skørping) Chairman of the Danish Football Union (DBU) since 2014
 Jakob Axel Nielsen (born 1967 in Terndrup near Skørping) a Danish lawyer and politician, brought up in Hadsund
 Bo Svensson (born 1979 in Skørping) a retired Danish professional footballer, 291 club caps

References

 Municipal statistics: NetBorger Kommunefakta, delivered from KMD aka Kommunedata (Municipal Data)
 Municipal mergers and neighbors: Eniro new municipalities map

External links
 Rebild  municipality's official website (Danish only)
 Rebild tourism bureau
 Rebild National Park Society, Inc

Former municipalities of Denmark
Cities and towns in the North Jutland Region
Rebild Municipality